Lauren Kelly (born May 2, 1996) is an American ice hockey defender, currently playing with the Boston Pride of the National Women's Hockey League (NWHL).

Career 
During high school, she played for The Winchendon School, serving as team captain in final year and becoming the school's first-ever female recipient of the Jason Ritchie Hockey Scholarship.

From 2014 to 2018, she attended Northeastern University, scoring 64 points in 140 NCAA games. She scored her first career collegiate goal against Mercyhurst on the 17th of October 2014, starting a three-game scoring streak. She notched a career-high 21 points in 36 games in her senior year, being named a WHEA Second-Team All-Star and a New England Hockey Writers' Division I All-Star.

She was drafted 16th overall by the Boston Pride in the 2017 NWHL Draft. After graduating, she would sign her first professional contract with the team. She put up three points in sixteen games in her rookie NWHL season.

Her production jumped during the 2019-20 season, up to 12 points in 23 games, as the Pride went almost undefeated during the regular season and made it to the Isobel Cup finals before the season was cancelled due to the COVID-19 pandemic in the United States.

Career statistics 

Source

References

External links
 

1996 births
Living people
Boston Pride players
Ice hockey players from Massachusetts
Northeastern Huskies women's ice hockey players
People from Watertown, Massachusetts
American women's ice hockey defensemen
Sportspeople from Middlesex County, Massachusetts